Xylazine is a pharmaceutical drug used for sedation, anesthesia, muscle relaxation, and analgesia in animals such as horses, cattle, and other non-human mammals. Veterinarians also use xylazine as an emetic, especially in cats.

In veterinary anesthesia, xylazine is often used in combination with ketamine. It is sold under many brand names worldwide, most notably the Bayer brand name Rompun. It is also marketed as Anased, Sedazine, and Chanazine. The drug interactions vary with different animals.

It has become a drug of abuse in the United States, where it is known by the street name "tranq," and particularly in Puerto Rico. The drug is being diverted from stocks used by equine veterinarians and used as a cutting agent for heroin, causing skin sores and infections at injection sites as well as other health issues.

Medical uses

Xylazine is often used as a sedative, muscle relaxant, and analgesic. It is frequently used in the treatment of tetanus. Xylazine is very similar to drugs such as phenothiazine, tricyclic antidepressants, and clonidine. As an anesthetic, it is typically used in conjunction with ketamine. Xylazine appears to reduce sensitivity to insulin and glucose uptake in humans. Yohimbine, an  adrenergic receptor antagonist, has been used to decrease glucose levels to a healthy level. In clinical settings, yohimbine can reverse the adverse effects of xylazine if administered intravenously shortly after xylazine administration.

Side effects

Xylazine overdose is usually fatal in humans. Because it is used as a drug adulterant, the symptoms caused by the drugs accompanying xylazine administration vary between individuals.

The most common side effects in humans associated with xylazine administration include bradycardia, respiratory depression, hypotension, transient hypertension secondary to alpha-1 stimulation, and other central and hemodynamic changes. Xylazine significantly decreases heart rate in animals that are not premedicated with medications that have anticholinergic effects.

Xylazine administration can lead to diabetes mellitus and hyperglycemia. Other possible side effects that can occur are areflexia, asthenia, ataxia, blurred vision, disorientation, dizziness, drowsiness, dysarthria, dysmetria, fainting, hyporeflexia, slurred speech, somnolence, staggering, coma, apnea, shallow breathing, sleepiness, premature ventricular contraction, tachycardia, miosis, and dry mouth. Rarely, hypotonia, dry mouth, urinary incontinence and nonspecific electrocardiographic ST segment changes occur. It has been reported that the duration of symptoms after human overdose is 8–72 hours. Further research is necessary to categorize the side effects that occur when xylazine is used in conjunction with heroin and cocaine.

Chronic use is reported to be associated with physical deterioration, dependence, abscesses, and skin ulceration, which can be physically debilitating and painful. Hypertension followed by hypotension, bradycardia, and respiratory depression lower tissue oxygenation in the skin. Thus, chronic use of xylazine can progress the skin oxygenation deficit, leading to severe skin ulceration. Lower skin oxygenation is associated with impaired healing of wounds and a higher chance of infection. The ulcers may ooze pus and have a characteristic odor. In severe cases, amputations must be performed on the affected extremities.

Overdose

The known doses of xylazine that produce toxicity and fatality in humans vary from 40 to 2400 mg. Small doses may produce toxicity and larger doses may be survived with medical assistance. Non-fatal blood or plasma concentration ranges from 0.03 to 4.6 mg/L. In fatalities, the blood concentration of xylazine ranges from trace to 16 mg/L. It is reported that there is no defined safe or fatal concentration of xylazine because of the significant overlap between the non-fatal and postmortem blood concentrations of xylazine.

Currently, there is no specific antidote to treat humans who overdose on xylazine. Hemodialysis has been suggested as a form of treatment, but is usually unfavorable due to the large volume of distribution of xylazine. In addition, due to lack of research in humans, there are no standardized screenings to determine if an overdose has occurred. The detection of xylazine in biological fluids in humans involves various screening methods, such as urine screenings, thin layer chromatography (TLC), gas chromatography mass spectrometry (GC-MS) and liquid chromatography mass spectrometry (LC-MS).

Multiple drugs have been used as supportive therapeutic intervention such as lidocaine, naloxone, thiamine, lorazepam, vecuronium, etomidate, propofol, tolazoline, yohimbine, atropine,  orciprenaline, metoclopramide, ranitidine, metoprolol, enoxaparin, flucloxacillin, insulin, and irrigation of both eyes with saline. Effects of xylazine are also reversed by the analeptics 4-aminopyridine, doxapram, and caffeine, which are physiological antagonists to central nervous system depressants. Combining yohimbine and 4-aminopyridine in an effort to antagonize xylazine is superior as compared to the administration of either of these drugs individually due to reduction of recovery time. Research initiatives may be necessary in order to standardize treatment and determine effective measures for identifying chronic xylazine usage and intoxication.

The treatment after xylazine overdose should primarily involve maintaining respiratory function and blood pressure. In cases of intoxication, physicians recommend intravenous fluid infusion, atropine, and hospital observation. Severe cases may require endotracheal intubation, mechanical ventilation, gastric lavage, activated charcoal, bladder catheterization, electrocardiographic (ECG) and hyperglycemia monitoring. Physicians typically recommend which detoxification treatment should be used to manage possible dysfunction involving highly perfused organs, such as the liver and kidney.

Pharmacology

Pharmacodynamics

Xylazine is a potent  adrenergic agonist. When xylazine and other  adrenergic receptor agonists are administered, they distribute throughout the body within 30–40 minutes. Due to xylazine's highly lipophilic nature, xylazine directly stimulates central  receptors as well as peripheral -adrenoceptors in a variety of tissues. As an agonist, xylazine leads to a decrease in neurotransmission of norepinephrine and dopamine in the central nervous system. It does so by mimicking norepinephrine in binding to presynaptic surface autoreceptors, which leads to feedback inhibition of norepinephrine.

Xylazine also serves as a transport inhibitor by suppressing norepinephrine transport function through competitive inhibition of substrate transport. Accordingly, xylazine significantly increases  and does not affect . This likely occurs by direct interaction on an area that overlaps with the antidepressant binding site. For example, xylazine and clonidine suppress uptake of MIBG, a norepinephrine analog, in neuroblastoma cells. Xylazine has varying affinities for cholinergic, serotonergic, dopaminergic,  adrenergic, H-histaminergic and opiate receptors. Its chemical structure closely resembles the phenothiazines, tricyclic antidepressants, and clonidine.

Pharmacokinetics

Xylazine is absorbed, metabolized, and eliminated rapidly. Xylazine can be inhaled or administered intravenously, intramuscularly, subcutaneously, or orally either by itself or in conjunction with other anesthetics, such as ketamine, barbiturates, chloral hydrate, and halothane in order to provide reliable anesthesia effects. The most common route of administration is injection. The drug is used as a veterinary anesthetic and the recommended dose varies between species.

Xylazine's action can be seen usually 15–30 minutes after administration and the sedative effect may continue for 1–2 hours and last up to 4 hours. Once xylazine gains access to the vascular system, it is distributed within the blood, allowing xylazine to perfuse target organs including the heart, lungs, liver, and kidney. In nonfatal cases, the blood plasma concentrations range from 0.03–4.6 mg/L. Xylazine diffuses extensively and penetrates the blood–brain barrier, as might be expected due to the uncharged, lipophilic nature of the compound.

Xylazine is metabolized by liver cytochrome P450 enzymes. When it reaches the liver, xylazine is metabolized and proceeds to the kidneys to be excreted as urine. Around 70% of a dose is excreted by urine. Thus, urine can be used in detecting xylazine administration because it contains many metabolites, which are the main targets and products in urine. Within a few hours, xylazine decreases to undetectable levels. Other factors can also significantly impact the pharmacokinetics of xylazine, including sex, nutrition, environmental conditions, and prior diseases. 
{| class="wikitable" style = "text-align:center"
|+Xylazine Metabolites 
|-
| Xylazine-M (2,6 dimethylaniline) || Xylazine-M (N-thiourea-2,6-dimethylaniline) || Xylazine-M (sulfone-HO-) isomer 2  
|-
| Xylazine-M (HO-2,6-dimethylaniline isomer 1) || Xylazine-M (HO-2,6-dimethylaniline isomer 2) || Xylazine M (oxo-)
|-
| Xylazine-M (HO-) isomer 1 || Xylazine-M (HO-) isomer 1 glucuronide || Xylazine-M (HO-) isomer 2
|-
| Xylazine-M (HO-) isomer 2 glucuronide || Xylazine-M (HO-oxo-) isomer 1 || Xylazine-M (HO-oxo-) isomer 1 glucuronide
|-
| Xylazine-M (HO-oxo-) isomer 2 || Xylazine-M (HO-oxo-) isomer 2 glucuronide || Xylazine-M (sulfone)
|-
|  || Xylazine-M (sulfone-HO-) isomer 1 || 
|}

History

Xylazine was discovered as an antihypertensive agent in 1962 by Farbenfabriken Bayer in Leverkusen, Germany. Results from early human clinical studies confirmed that xylazine has several central nervous system depressant effects. Xylazine administration is used for sedation, anesthesia, muscle relaxation, and analgesia. It causes a significant reduction in blood pressure and heart rate in healthy volunteers. Due to hazardous side effects, including hypotension and bradycardia, xylazine was not approved by the Food and Drug Administration (FDA) for human use. As a result, xylazine's mechanism of action in humans remains unknown.

Xylazine was approved by the FDA for veterinary use and is now used as an animal tranquilizer. In the United States, xylazine was only approved by the FDA for veterinary use as a sedative, analgesic, and muscle relaxant in dogs, cats, horses, elk, fallow deer, mule deer, sika deer, and white-tailed deer. The sedative and analgesic effects of xylazine are related to central nervous system depression. Xylazine's muscle relaxant effect inhibits the transmission of neural impulses in the central nervous system.

In scientific research, xylazine is a component of the most common anesthetic, ketamine-xylazine (see rodent cocktail), which is used in rats, mice, hamster, and guinea pigs. The accounts of the actions and uses of xylazine in animals were reported as early as the late 1960s and early 1970s.

Recreational use

Since the early 2000s, xylazine has become popular as a drug of abuse in the United States and Puerto Rico. Xylazine's street name in Puerto Rico is anestesia de caballo, which translates to "horse anesthetic". Xylazine's street name in United States is  "tranq", "tranq dope", and "zombie drug".

Xylazine users are more likely to be male, under age 30, living in a rural area, and injecting versus inhaling xylazine. Xylazine has similar behavioral consequences as heroin, thus it is commonly used as an adulterant. Xylazine is also frequently found in "speedball" (a mixture of several abused drugs – usually cocaine, heroin or morphine, and fentanyl). The combination of heroin and xylazine produces a potentially more deadly high than administration of heroin alone. Use of xylazine in combination with "speedball" may potentiate or prolong the effects  of the other drugs, which can lead to adverse consequences.

In 1979, the first case of xylazine toxicity was reported, in a 34-year-old male who had self-medicated for insomnia with injection of 1 g of xylazine. Intentional intoxication from ingesting, inhaling, or injecting xylazine has been reported. The intravenous route is the most common route of administration for those who abuse heroin or xylazine recreationally. In Puerto Rico, xylazine has increased in popularity. Its use was associated with a high number of inmate deaths at the Guerrero Correctional Institution in Aguadilla, Puerto Rico, from 2002 to 2008.

When abused by humans, frequency of xylazine use depends on social or economic factors, as well as each user's subjective response to the drug's addictive properties. Naloxone can reverse the effect of opioid overdose, but has no effect on xylazine. As of November 2022, its detection in the bloodstream requires a spectrophotometer-based test. 

Causal factors underlying xylazine's increasing popularity are still unknown. Further research is needed to gain more information on the distribution of xylazine in the body, physical symptoms, potential treatments, and factors predictive of chronic use.

Veterinary use

In animals, xylazine may be administered intramuscularly or intravenously. As a veterinary anesthetic, xylazine is typically only administered once for intended effect before or during surgical procedures.

Side effects

Side effects in animals include transient hypertension, hypotension, and respiratory depression. Further, the decrease of tissue sensitivity to insulin leads to xylazine-induced hyperglycemia and a reduction of tissue glucose uptake and utilization. The duration of effects in animals lasts up to 4 hours.

Pharmacokinetics

In dogs, sheep, horses, and cattle, the half-life is very short: only 1.21–5.97 minutes. Complete elimination of the drug can take up to 23.11 minutes in sheep and up to 49.51 minutes in horses. In young rats, the half life is one hour. Xylazine has a large volume of distribution (Vd). The  = 1.9–2.5 for horses, cattle, sheep, and dogs. Though the peak plasma concentrations are reached in 12–14 minutes in all species, the bioavailability varies between species. The half life depends on the age of the animal, as age is related to prolonged duration of anesthesia and recovery time. Toxicity occurs with repeated administration, given that the metabolic clearance of the drug is usually calculated as 7–9 times the half-life, which is 4 to 5 days for the clearance of xylazine.

References

Further reading 

 
 
 

Alpha-2 adrenergic receptor agonists
Analgesics
Equine medications
Thiazines